"Sasayaki" (囁き) (English: whisper) is the fourteenth single released by the Japanese rock band Buck-Tick, released on March 11, 1998.

Track listing

Musicians
 Atsushi Sakurai - Voice
 Hisashi Imai - Guitar
 Hidehiko Hoshino - Guitar
 Yutaka Higuchi - Bass
 Toll Yagami - Drums
 Kazutoshi Yokoyama - keyboard
 Steve White - Rhythm Programming (# 2)
 Carol Ann Reynolds - chorus (# 2)
 Günter Schulz - programming, guitar (# 3)
 Daniel Ash - voice, guitar, percussion, effects (# 4)
 Wal Paul Fish - keyboard (# 4)

References

1998 singles
Buck-Tick songs
1998 songs
Mercury Records singles
Songs with lyrics by Atsushi Sakurai
Songs with music by Hisashi Imai